The Klondike Fire was a wildfire in the U.S. state of Oregon. During the fire, a part of the fire was merged into the Taylor Creek Fire, that specific fire, had burned .

Fire growth and containment progress

References

2018 Oregon wildfires